Yury Nikolayevich Shafinsky (born 6 May 1994) is a Russian football goalkeeper.

Career
He made his debut in the Russian Second Division for FC Lokomotiv-2 Moscow on 5 November 2013 in a game against FC Pskov-747 Pskov.

On 12 August 2015, Shafinsky signed a four-year contract with FC Anzhi Makhachkala.

He made his Russian Football National League debut for FC Tom Tomsk on 8 July 2017 in a game against FC Kuban Krasnodar.

On 3 February 2019, he signed with FC Ufa.

References

External links
 
 

1994 births
Footballers from Moscow
Living people
Russian footballers
Russia youth international footballers
Association football goalkeepers
FC Torpedo Moscow players
FC Lokomotiv Moscow players
FC Tom Tomsk players
FC Anzhi Makhachkala players
FC Ufa players